Aleutians West Census Area is a census area located in the U.S. state of Alaska. As of the 2020 census, the population was 5,232, down from 5,561 in 2010. 

It is part of the Unorganized Borough and therefore has no borough seat. Its largest city is Unalaska, home to about 80% of the population. It contains most of the Aleutian Islands, from Attu Island in the west to Unalaska Island in the east, as well as the Pribilof Islands, which lie north of the Aleutians in the Bering Sea.

Geography
It borders the Aleutians East Borough to the east.

National protected areas
 Alaska Maritime National Wildlife Refuge (part of the Aleutian Islands and Bering Sea units)
 Aleutian Islands Wilderness (part)
 Bogoslof Wilderness
 Pribilof Islands
 Aleutian World War II National Historic Area

Demographics
A 2014 analysis by The Atlantic found the Aleutians West Census Area to be the most racially diverse county-equivalent in the United States. According to the Brookings Institution, Asian Americans are the largest population of color in the census area, a majority of which are Filipino Americans.

2000 Census 
At the 2000 census there were 5,465 people, 1,270 households, and 736 families residing in the census area. The population density was 1.24 people per square mile (0.48/km2). There were 2,234 housing units at an average density of 0.51/sq mi (0.20/km2). 

The racial makup of the census area was 40.04% White, 3.02% Black or African American, 20.95% Native American, 24.59% Asian, 0.62% Pacific Islander, 7.32% from other races, and 3.46% from two or more races. 10.48%. were Hispanic or Latino of any race. 13.89% reported speaking Tagalog at home, while 11.22% speak Spanish, 5.97% Aleut, and 4.51% Vietnamese.

Of the 1,270 households 35.40% had children under the age of 18 living with them, 44.00% were married couples living together, 7.60% had a female householder with no husband present, and 42.00% were non-families. 32.00% of households were one person and 2.10% were one person aged 65 or older. The average household size was 2.52 and the average family size was 3.26.

The age distribution was 17.20% under the age of 18, 7.80% from 18 to 24, 47.60% from 25 to 44, 25.10% from 45 to 64, and 2.30% 65 or older. The median age was 36 years. For every 100 females, there were 180.00 males. For every 100 females age 18 and over, there were 202.10 males.

2020 Census

Communities 
The largest community in the Aleutians West Census Area is the city of Unalaska.

Cities
 Adak
 Atka
 St. George
 St. Paul
 Unalaska

Census-designated places
 Attu Station
 Nikolski
 Eareckson Station

Politics and government

At the federal level, the Aleutians West Census Area is part of Alaska's at-large congressional district along with the rest of the state. The census area is represented by Lyman Hoffman (D) in the Alaska Senate and by Bryce Edgmon (D) in the Alaska House of Representatives.

Education
School districts within the census area are: Aleutian Region School District, Pribilof School District, and Unalaska City School District.

See also

 List of airports in Alaska
National Register of Historic Places listings in Aleutians West Census Area, Alaska

References

External links

 Aleutians West Census Area at the Community Database Online from the Alaska Division of Community and Regional Affairs
 Maps from the Alaska Department of Labor and Workforce Development: 

 
Alaska census areas
Bering Sea